Atlántico is a department of Colombia, located in northern Colombia with the Caribbean Sea to its north, the Bolívar Department to its west and south separated by the Canal del Dique, and the Magdalena Department to its east separated by the Magdalena River. It is the third-smallest of the country's departments but its population of 2,535,517 makes it one of the most densely populated.

Its capital is Barranquilla. Other important cities include Sabanalarga, Soledad and Malambo.

Governors

Politics

Administrative divisions

Municipalities

 Baranoa
 Barranquilla
 Campo de la Cruz
 Candelaria
 Galapa
 Juan de Acosta
 Luruaco
 Malambo
 Manatí
 Palmar de Varela
 Piojó
 Polonuevo
 Ponedera
 Puerto Colombia
 Repelón
 Sabanagrande
 Sabanalarga
 Santa Lucía
 Santo Tomás
 Soledad
 Suán
 Tubará
 Usiacurí

References

External links

 Government of Atlantico Department official website

 
Departments of Colombia
Caribbean region of Colombia
States and territories established in 1910